This is a list of current public middle schools in Oakland, California, including charter schools.

Schools administered by the Oakland Unified School District

 Alliance Academy
 Bret Harte Middle School (established 1930) 
 Claremont Middle School
 Coliseum College Prep Academy (6-12)
 Edna M. Brewer Middle School
 Elmhurst Community Prep
 Frick Middle School
 Madison Park Academy 
 Melrose Leadership Academy
 Montera Middle School
 Roosevelt Middle School (formerly Roosevelt High School)
 ROOTS International Academy
 United for Success Academy
 Westlake Middle School
West Oakland Middle School

Charter Schools
 American Indian Public Charter School
 Ascend Middle School (TK-8)   
Bay Area Technology School or BayTech (6-12)    
 East Bay Innovation Academy (6-12) 
 KIPP Bridge College Prep
 Life Academy (6-12)
Oakland Charter Academy
 Oakland School for the Arts (6-12)
 Urban Promise Academy

Closed Schools

 Barack Obama Academy - closed 2012  
 Calvin Simmons Middle School (formerly Alexander Hamilton Junior High) - closed 2007 
 Cole Middle School - closed 2009 
 Community Day Middle School - closed 2022 
 Explore Middle School - closed 2010 
 KIZMET Academy (formerly Lowell Middle School)- closed 2007 
 La Escuelita Middle School - closed 2022 
 Parker Middle School - closed 2022 
 Peralta Creek Middle School - closed 2009 
 Verdese Carter Middle School campus of Oakland International High School (formerly Woodrow Wilson Junior High) - closed 2006 -

References

See also
List of Oakland, California elementary schools
List of Oakland, California high schools

Oakland middle schools
Education in Oakland, California
Middle schools